Frenchay is a village in the County of South Gloucestershire, England, and the Civil Parish of Winterbourne.  It is on the outskirts to the north east of the city of Bristol. 

Frenchay was first recorded in 1257 as Fromscawe and later as Fromeshaw, meaning the wood on the Frome.

The village is situated between the B4058 road, which runs parallel to the M32 motorway, and the wooded River Frome valley.

Frenchay's largest place of worship is the Anglican Church of  St John the Baptist, adjacent to the large village common, which is overlooked by a number of 18th-century houses principally built by wealthy Quaker families. These include the very fine former Rectory, Bradford's House and the adjacent Frenchay Common House. Also overlooking the common is the village school which dates from 1842.  The village also contains a Catholic church, a Quaker Meeting House and a Unitarian chapel.

Cricket was played on Frenchay Common from early in the nineteenth century, apparently on the initiative of the Wadham family who lived at Frenchay Manor House, owned farms locally at Doynton, Pomfrey, Mangotsfield, Downend and Frenchay, and many of whom are buried in the graveyard of St John the Baptist Church.

W.G. Grace, the famous Victorian cricketer, whose family lived in the next village of Downend, was captain of the village cricket team. The Frenchay Cricket Club, which is said to have been the first village club in the county, was established in 1846.

Frenchay gives its name to the Frenchay Campus of the University of the West of England, though the campus itself is situated in the neighbouring parish of Stoke Gifford.

Frenchay was the home to Frenchay Hospital, greatly expanded during World War II for the US Army, which treated wounded soldiers returning from the D-Day landings in Normandy. Facilities merged with Southmead Hospital, further towards the centre of the city in 2014. A&E services closed on 19 May 2014. The closure of Frenchay Hospital has made way for a new housing development.

Frenchay village has much green space, including the common, walks along the River Frome, and a moor owned by The National Trust. The Village Hall is a village hub, and there is an annual village flower show.

Frenchay's earliest place of worship was the Quaker Meeting House. The present one dates from 1809, and it replaced an earlier one of 1670.

Many Quaker merchants from nearby Bristol made their homes here, including Joseph Storrs Fry, the Quaker chocolate manufacturer, who styled his company J S Fry & Sons, which manufactured the first ever commercially available chocolate bar in the world. He moved to Grove House (now Riverwood House) in 1800. He died in 1835 and is buried in the burying ground behind the Meeting House along with his wife and daughter, Pricilla.

John Wadham (1762–1843) of Frenchay Manor House, was from 1789, a co-owner and director of Wadham, Ricketts & Co, later Wadham, Ricketts, Fry & Co, which manufactured Bristol blue glass at the Phoenix Glassworks near Temple Gate, Bristol, examples of which can be seen in Bristol Museum, and was a director of the Bristol Floating Harbour Company in 1820.

His son Thomas Wadham (1797–1849)
was High Sheriff of Bristol in 1843, the year that Isambard Kingdom Brunel launched his ship SS Great Britain in
Bristol Harbour. Thomas Wadham and his son the Rev. John Wadham were active in setting up the Winterbourne National School and his daughters were involved on the school's women's committee.

Thomas's son Edward Wadham (1828–1913), Mineral Agent to Walter Montagu Douglas Scott, 5th Duke of Buccleuch took his skills as a civil engineer who had worked under Brunel and his love of cricket to Barrow-in-Furness where, from 1851 until his death in 1913, he played an important part in the development of what had been a tiny hamlet into the biggest iron and steel centre in the world, and a major ship-building force, in just forty years.

Frenchay Park, an adjacent suburb, is situated within Bristol city limits.

Notable people
Peter Donald (born 1957), cricketer

References 

Civil Parish of Winterbourne
Areas of Bristol
Villages in South Gloucestershire District